Gersbach is a state-recognized resort town in the municipality of Schopfheim, a town in the district of Lörrach in Baden-Württemberg, Germany.

Gersbach is situated in a mountain valley basin to the south from the eponymous river in the Black Forest at an altitude of 800–1170 m above sea level. The old town of Schopfheim is roughly 17 km away. The formerly independent village, together with the six associated hamlets (Fetzenbach, Gersbach-Au, Lochmühle, Metteln, Neuhaus, and Schlechtbach) forms one of Baden-Württemberg's largest Gemarkung, with an area of 2409 hectares.

References

Lörrach (district)
Baden